James Ford Murphy is an American animator. He is the head of animation at Pixar Animation Studios. He directed the 2014 short film Lava.

Filmography

Feature films
 A Bug's Life – additional character designer, animator
 Toy Story 2 – animator
 Monsters, Inc. – animator
 Finding Nemo – animator
 The Incredibles – animator
 Cars – directing animator
 Ratatouille – animator
 Up – production resources
 Brave – production resources

Short films
 For the Birds – supervising animator
 Mike's New Car – animator
 Mater and the Ghostlight – supervising animator
 Partly Cloudy – special thanks
 Lava – director, writer, story, music, ukulele
 Miss Fritter’s Racing Skoool - director, writer

Documentaries
 The Pixar Story – himself (as Jim Murphy)

Video games
 Torin's Passage – lead animator (as Jim Murphy)

References

External links

American animators
Living people
Pixar people
Year of birth missing (living people)